Osuské is a village and municipality in Senica District in the Trnava Region of western Slovakia. There is a Catholic church first mentioned in 1468 with an organ rebuilt in 1844. Osuské was well known by a unique costume used especially at Mass on Sunday or in celebration time until the middle of the 20th century.

History
In historical records the village was first mentioned in 1262.

Geography
The municipality lies at an altitude of 218 metres and covers an area of 11.607 km2. It has a population of about 614 people.

References

External links

 Official page
http://www.statistics.sk/mosmis/eng/run.html

Villages and municipalities in Senica District